Simone Di Pasquale (Rome, 27 February 1978) is an Italian dancer, television personality and dance teacher.

Biography 

His artistic training began with the dance sport.

From 2000 to 2008, paired with the ballerina Natalia Titova, he has successfully participated in numerous competitions. In 2004, the couple took:
 fifth place in the competition World Master of Innsbruck
 third place in the competition Rising Stars of Blackpool
 first place in the competition Rising Stars UK.

In 2005 he started to appear in the TV show "Dancing With The Stars", conducted by Milly Carlucci and broadcast on Saturday evening on RAI 1. He won the first edition paired with Hoara Borselli and continued to participate from 2006 to 2014.

Between 2006 and 2009, he was a guest on several television programs of RAI 1:
• "Il Treno dei Desideri ";
• "Miss Italia", as an arbiter  and the protagonist of the institutional spot for the promotion of the territory;
• "Miss Italy in the World", in the role of principal dancer;
• "Don Matteo", sixth edition, in the role of co-starred in an episode of the series

Simone also performed on Italian’s most famous stage, participating in renowned shows:

• Between 2006 and 2008, starring in the role of Tony Manero in the national tour of The Saturday Night Fever, directed by Massimo Romeo Piparo

• In 2008, in the role of Link Larkin in the musical Hairspray - Fat is Beautiful!, directed by Massimo Romeo Piparo, which was performed in several Italian cities including Rome, Milan, Florence, Verona, Bologna and Naples, Catania.

After dancing for many years Simone launched a teaching activity, to transfer to the younger generation's passion and professionalism.

In 2000 he opened in Rome his dance school "Klassic Dance Studio", which in 2008 became "Star Dance Academy".
In 2011 Simone founded the company "Twister Entertainment Srl", which he currently holds. The company deals with the organization of events and initiatives aimed at dance and entertainment, addressed both at public events, both for private / business events.

In 2012 Simone started a training program "Latin Up®" - a combination of Latin American dance steps with an aerobic workout - and the Latin American dance class founded on the formula "Personal Dancer®". The course includes individual lessons taught by teachers and dancer competitors with students of all ages and levels, associated with group lessons aimed to deepen the technique and practice.

In July 2013 he presented the final of the European Championship of Tango at the Capitol Club of Rome, with the show "Galatango", broadcast on RAI 1.

In July 2014 he participated with Milly Carlucci and other dancers from  Dancing with the Stars in the Canadian tour Dances with Milly.

Television

References

1978 births
Living people
Italian male dancers
21st-century Italian dancers
Italian ballroom dancers
People from Rome